Savaari may refer to:

 Savaari (2009 film), a Kannada-language film
 its 2014 sequel, Savaari 2
 Savaari (2018 film), a Malayalam-language film
 Savaari (2020 film), a Telugu-language film